Android Go, officially Android (Go edition), is a stripped-down version of the Android operating system, designed for low-end and ultra-budget smartphones (but is also used by some tablets). However, it is intended for smartphones with less than 3 GB of RAM and was first made available for Android Oreo. This mode has platform optimizations designed to reduce mobile data usage (including enabling Data Saver mode by default), and a special suite of Google Mobile Services designed to be less resource and bandwidth-intensive. Google Play Services package was also modularized to reduce its memory footprint. The Google Play Store will highlight lighter apps suited for these devices.

The operating system's interface differs from that of mainline Android, with the quick-settings panel giving greater prominence to information regarding the battery, mobile-data limit, and available storage; the recent apps menu using a modified layout and being limited to four apps (in order to reduce RAM consumption), and an application programming interface (API) for allowing mobile carriers to implement data-tracking and top-ups within the Android settings menu. Some system services are disabled such as Notification access and Picture-in-picture mode to improve performance. 

Most devices running Android Go use Google's "stock" Android GUI, although there are several manufacturers that still use customized GUI.

Versions
Android Go was made available to OEMs for Android 8.1, and later, for Android Pie.

See also
 Comparison of Android Go products
 Android One, a version of Android originally designed for entry-level and budget devices

References

External links
 

Android (operating system)
Smartphone operating systems
Tablet computers
ARM operating systems